General elections were held in British Honduras on 26 March 1961. They were the first following a constitutional review, which had increased the number of elected seats from 9 to 18, whilst a further five members would be appointed by the Governor and two would be officials. The result was a victory for the ruling People's United Party, which won all 18 seats.

The National Independence Party, founded in 1958 by a merger of the two previous major opposition parties, the Honduran Independence Party and the National Party, contested general elections for the first time in 1961. A third party formed by former PUP and NP members, the Christian Democratic Party, also fielded candidates. Both parties failed to win seats.

Results

By division

References

British H
General elections in Belize
1961 in British Honduras
British H
British H